Bonaventura Clotet Sala (Barcelona, 1953) is a Spanish (Catalan) physician. He has been the head of the HIV unit at the Germans Trias i Pujol University Hospital (HUGTiP) in Badalona from 1987 to 2015, and since then he has been the head of the Infectious Diseases service at the same hospital. He has been the director of the IrsiCaixa AIDS Research Institute since 1995 and chairman of the Fight Against AIDS Foundation since 1992. Since 2006 he has been co-director of the HIVACAT AIDS vaccine research program. He has been an associate professor at the Autonomous University of Barcelona since 1986 and director of the Chair in AIDS and Related Diseases at the University of Vic (UVic - UCC), since October 2013.

References 

People from Barcelona
21st-century Spanish physicians
1953 births
Living people